Songs from the Small Machine: Live in L.A at Saban Theatre in Beverly Hills, CA / 2011 is a live album by Fleetwood Mac guitarist/vocalist Lindsey Buckingham. It was released on November 1, 2011 on standard DVD and Blu-ray, the standard DVD contains a CD of the tracks, but the Blu-ray omits the audio CD. The performances were recorded at the Saban Theatre in Beverly Hills on April 22, 2011 when Lindsey and his backing band were on tour promoting the Seeds We Sow album.

Track listing
All tracks written by Buckingham except where noted.

 "Shut Us Down" (Buckingham, Cory Sipper)
 "Go Insane"
 "Trouble"
 "Never Going Back Again"
 "Big Love"
 "Under The Skin"
 "All My Sorrows" (Traditional)
 "In Our Own Time"
 "Illumination"
 "Second Hand News"
 "Tusk"
 "Stars Are Crazy" (Buckingham, Lisa Dewey)
 "End of Time"
 "That's the Way That Love Goes"
 "I'm So Afraid"
 "Go Your Own Way"
 "Turn It On" (Buckingham, Richard Dashut)
 "Treason"
 "Seeds We Sow"

Personnel 
 Lindsey Buckingham – guitar, lead vocals
 Brett Tuggle – bass, keyboards, backing vocals
 Neale Heywood – guitar, backing vocals
 Walfredo Reyes Jr. – drums, percussion

Lindsey Buckingham albums
2011 live albums
2011 video albums
Live video albums